Jim Adduci may refer to:

Jim Adduci (baseball, born 1959), American former left-handed outfielder and first baseman
Jim Adduci (baseball, born 1985), Canadian baseball outfielder

See also
Adduci